The largest coal mining companies of the world are found in several countries, the most prominent among them being the United States, Australia, India and China. Unlike the article on the List of largest mining companies by revenue, this article focuses solely on coal mining companies and deliberately avoids listing companies that mine Gold, Silver or Platinum. This article also avoid listing companies like Glencore or Trafigura which are essentially trading companies or holding companies; they are not actual mining companies.

Largest coal mining companies of the world 

Both private and public companies are included in this list.

See also 

 List of largest manufacturing companies by revenue
 List of public corporations by market capitalization
 List of largest chemical producers

References 

 
Economy-related lists of superlatives
Mining
Companies by revenue